Bengt Rune Strifeldt  (born 24 March 1971) is a Norwegian politician. 
He was elected representative to the Storting for the period 2017–2021 for the Progress Party.

References

1971 births
Living people
Progress Party (Norway) politicians
Members of the Storting
Finnmark politicians